Bungarimba is a genus of flowering plants in the family Rubiaceae. The type species was transferred from Porterandia by K.M. Wong in 2004. The genus is found from Borneo, Malaysia, Sumatra and New Guinea.

Species 

 Bungarimba kahayanensis K.M.Wong - Kalimantan
 Bungarimba papuana K.M.Wong - Papua New Guinea
 Bungarimba ridsdalei K.M.Wong - Sabah
 Bungarimba sessiliflora (Ridl.) K.M.Wong - Borneo, Malaysia, Sumatra

References

External links 
 Bungarimba in the World Checklist of Rubiaceae

Rubiaceae genera
Gardenieae